Summit Lake Park is a park located along Mount Evans Scenic Byway about 64 miles (100 km) west of Denver, Colorado.  The park is 160 acres (0.65 km²) in size and contains alpine tundra. Land to the east of the lake is in a state of permafrost which helps to prevent drainage of the area.  During the summer, the park is filled with wildflowers, some of which have not been found anywhere else outside of the Arctic Circle.  The park is named after Summit Lake, the headwaters of Bear Creek.

Summit Lake
Summit Lake is a tarn which sits at 12,836 feet (3,912 m) elevation in a glacial cirque on the north face of Mount Evans and the east face of Mount Spalding.  To the north, there is a col (12,855 feet/3918 m elevation) looking down into the chain of two cirques holding the Chicago Lakes at the headwaters of Chicago Creek.  By one count that includes several unnamed lakes, Summit Lake is the 13th highest lake in the United States.  In 1915, the USGS reported that Summit Lake was the highest lake in Colorado, at 12,740 feet.  Later secondary sources occasionally report it as the highest lake in the United States.

The land was acquired by Denver in 1924 and incorporated into the Denver Mountain Parks system.  It was declared a National Natural Landmark in April, 1965.

See also
National Register of Historic Places listings in Clear Creek County, Colorado
Echo Lake Park

References

External links
National Natural Landmark - Summit Lake

National Natural Landmarks in Colorado
Denver Mountain Parks
Parks on the National Register of Historic Places in Colorado
Protected areas of Clear Creek County, Colorado
Lakes of Colorado
Cirques of the United States
Bodies of water of Clear Creek County, Colorado
National Register of Historic Places in Clear Creek County, Colorado